Hongguo Subdistrict is a subdistrict in Panzhou, Guizhou, China.

History
On June 4, 2015, former Hongguo Town was upgraded to a subdistrict.

Administrative division
As of December 2015, the subdistrict is divided into 6 villages and 2 communities: 
 Yueliangshan Community
 Pingchuan Community
 Nuowan
 Zhichang
 Huajiazhuang
 Zhongsha
 Shele
 Xiasha

Economy
Hongguo Subdistrict's economy is based on nearby coal reserves and commerce.

Transport
The town is connected to 4 highways and roads: Zhen-Sheng Expressway, G320 National Highway, Wei-Hong Road and Bai-Huo Road.

The Hongguo railway station serves the town.

References

Divisions of Panzhou